Tawera is a genus of marine bivalves in the family Veneridae.

Species
As of 2019, the accepted Tawera species (As listed on WoRMS) are as follows.

 Tawera australiana M. Huber, 2010 
 Tawera coelata (Menke, 1843) 
 Tawera elliptica (Lamarck, 1818) 
 Tawera gallinula (Lamarck, 1818) 
 Tawera lagopus (Lamarck, 1818)
 Tawera laticostata (Odhner, 1917)
 Tawera marionae Finlay, 1928
 Tawera mawsoni (Hedley, 1916)
 Tawera phenax (Finlay, 1930)
 Tawera philomela (E. A. Smith, 1885)
 Tawera rosa Powell, 1955
 Tawera similicentrifuga (Viader, 1951)
 Tawera sphaericula (Deshayes, 1853)
 Tawera spissa (Deshayes, 1835)
 Tawera torresiana (E. A. Smith, 1884)

References

Bivalve genera
Veneridae